Buck Falls is a waterfall located at the east end of historical Hardman, in Morrow County, in the U.S. state of Oregon. It is located off Hepner-Spray Highway, formed by a spring creek on the north skirt of Buck Canyon.

See also 
 List of waterfalls in Oregon

References 

Waterfalls of Oregon
Landforms of Morrow County, Oregon